Hans Kämmerer (born 4 February 1937) is a German sailor. He competed in the Finn event at the 1960 Summer Olympics.

References

External links
 

1937 births
Living people
German male sailors (sport)
Olympic sailors of the United Team of Germany
Sailors at the 1960 Summer Olympics – Finn
Sportspeople from Düsseldorf